Steven Hogg (born 14 February 1960) is an Australian former soccer player who played at both professional and international levels as a defender.

Early and personal life
He was educated at the Anglican Church Grammar School.

His daughter, Kahlia has played national league soccer in Australia and the United States.

Career
Hogg played at club level for Canberra City, Brisbane Lions and Brisbane City.

He also earned four caps for Australia in 1980.

References

1960 births
Living people
Australian soccer players
Australia international soccer players
People educated at Anglican Church Grammar School
Queensland Lions FC players
Canberra City FC players
Brisbane City FC players
Association football defenders
1980 Oceania Cup players